The N4 road is a national primary road in Ireland, running from Dublin to the northwest of Ireland and Sligo town. The M6 to Galway diverges from this route after Kinnegad, while the N5 to Westport diverges at Longford town. Most sections of the N4 that are motorway-standard are designated the M4 motorway.

Road standard
The N4 originates at an intersection with the M50 motorway at Junction 7. This is also Junction 1 of the N/M4. The Liffey Valley Shopping Centre is located at Junction 2. The road has three lanes and a bus lane in each direction between the M50 and the start of the M4 at Leixlip.

The N4 was the only one of the main inter-urban national routes whose dual-carriageway section continued into the city centre; however, the section inside the M50 was re-classified as the R148 in 2012.

Heading west, the PPP motorway section (see below) ends west of Kinnegad, and the motorway terminates 5  km further west; it continues as HQDC and bypasses Mullingar. From the Mullingar bypass to Edgeworthstown, the road is a wide single carriageway with hard shoulders. Between Edgeworthstown and Longford, there is a lower standard single carriageway road. Between Longford and Rooskey single carriageway continues at a higher standard. Dromod and Rooskey were bypassed in late 2007. This section of the road consists of three roundabouts and a Type 2 dual carriageway, i.e.: two lanes in each direction and no hard shoulder. The road resumes as a single carriageway with hard shoulders until it reaches Carrick-on-Shannon, where it becomes a local urban road through five roundabouts, and passing over the River Shannon into County Roscommon. The road becomes a high-quality single carriageway bypass 3  km outside of Boyle town, with periodic alternating overtaking lanes passing Lough Key Forest Park and Ballinafad until it reaches Castlebaldwin. From Castlebaldwin to Collooney the road is a Type 2 dual carriageway. Funding for the expansion of this section was announced in October 2018, and it opened in 2021.  The road becomes near-motorway standard dual carriageway again at Collooney, approaching Sligo town.

M4 motorway
The section from Leixlip to the west of Kinnegad is the M4 motorway. The first section of this motorway (Leixlip – Kilcock) was opened on 19 December 1994.

Tolled section of the M4 motorway
Under the Government announcement of the pilot projects on 1 June 1999 this project was to be assessed by the NRA for its suitability to be advanced as a Public-private partnership (PPP). Subsequently, the project was included as one of the projects approved under Tranche II of the PPP Roads programme as announced by the NRA in June 2000. The project involved the construction of 39  km of motorway from Kinnegad to Kilcock and is an extension of the Kilcock-Maynooth-Leixlip motorway on the N4/N6 Sligo/Galway to Dublin route. The motorway bypasses the towns of Enfield and Kinnegad.

The PPP contract was awarded in March 2003 to the EuroLink Consortium (SIAC Construction Ltd and Cintra - Concesiones de Infraestructuras de Transporte S.A.) and allows for them to collect tolls for 30 years from that date.

This tolled section (from Kilcock to Kinnegad) opened on 12 December 2005, almost a year ahead of schedule. It is the second-most expensive toll road in Ireland (after the Dublin Port Tunnel). A toll of €3.00 (as of 2022) for cars is charged at a toll plaza just west of Kilcock and at smaller toll plazas at on and off-ramps at Enfield. Between Enfield and Kinnegad, no further access to the M4 is possible.

Eurolink operates this tolling scheme, the first in Ireland not operated by NTR plc. From 2005 to 2007, Eurolink started to accept several tags issued by other motorways such as M1, M8, eTrip and Dublin Port Tunnel tags. On 14 June 2007 NTR plc joined the Nationwide Electronic Toll Payment System introducing their popular EazyPass tags on the system and allowing all other toll plazas in the country (different from those owned by NTR plc) to accept them, meaning that each toll company's electronic tag will work on all toll roads in the State.

In the 1 July 2006 edition of the Meath Chronicle it was claimed that up to 10% of the €420 million road project had "to be ripped up and replaced" shortly after it opened due to rushed construction, however this cost would have had to be carried by the toll operators, not the state, as per the contract.

The bypassed former N4 road has been reclassified as the R148.

Junctions

Motorway reclassification
On 28 August 2009, the Department of Transport implemented the second round of proposed reclassifications of dual carriageways as motorways under the Roads Act 2007. A short section of the N4 between Kinnegad (J12) and McNead's Bridge (J13) was affected by this. This extended the M4 westward by 6.8 km.

Bypasses

 Palmerstown – 1984
 Lucan – 1988
 Leixlip, Maynooth, Kilcock – 1994
 Mullingar – 1994
 Longford – 1995
 Drumsna, Jamestown – 1997
 Collooney, Ballisodare – January 1998
 Boyle, Ballinafad – 1998–1999
 Sligo (partial) – September 2005
 Enfield, Kinnegad – December 2005
 Edgeworthstown – June 2006
 Dromod, Roosky – December 2007
 Castlebaldwin – August 2021

Upgrades

In July 2009, an upgrade of the section between the M50 junction and the Leixlip interchange was completed. In this section the road is three lanes in each direction, the median crossings were removed and the junction with the R120 is a fully grade-separated junction. Private accesses and some left turns remain which prevents the section from being designated a motorway. The speed limit is 80 km/h. There are currently no signal-controlled junctions on the N/M4 between the M50 motorway and the Sligo through-pass.

In 2013, a 5  km stretch of dual carriageway with at-grade crossover junctions between the M4 and the Mullingar bypass was upgraded to HQDC.

Construction of a 2+2 road at the 15 km stretch between Collooney and Castlebaldwin began in 2019 to improve road safety. The road was opened on 18 October 2021.

Planned improvements to the route

 Mullingar bypass to Longford; 40 km dual carriageway ; at constraints study stage
 Dromod to Carrick-on-Shannon; 11 km; at feasibility study stage
 Carrick-on-Shannon Bypass; 10 km; preliminary design stage
 Cortober to Castlebaldwin; 28 km retro upgrade of standard single carriageway road to 2+1 road; at constraints study stage
 Sligo Western Relief Road; 8 km; at feasibility study stage
 The motorway-style dual carriageway of the N4, running from Collooney—15 km outside Sligo—to Summerhill in Sligo town is not expected to be re-classified as a motorway in the near future.

See also
 Roads in Ireland
 Motorways in Ireland
 National secondary road
 Regional road

References

Sources
 Roads Act 1993 (Classification of National Roads) Order 2006 – Department of Transport
 Roads Act, 1993 (Classification of National Roads) (Kilkock – Kinnegad Route) Order, 2003
 Eurolink Motorway M4 website

04
Roads in County Dublin
Roads in County Kildare
Roads in County Meath
Roads in County Westmeath
Roads in County Longford
Roads in County Leitrim
Roads in County Roscommon
Roads in County Sligo
Road infrastructure in the Republic of Ireland